The 10 cm houfnice vz. 28 (howitzer model 28) was a Czech howitzer used in limited numbers by the Yugoslav Army during World War II.  The Yugoslavians ordered twenty houfnice vz. 28 guns which they referred to as the 100 mm M.28.  Guns captured from Yugoslavia by the Germans were given the designation 10 cm leFH 317(j).

Design & history
The origins of the houfnice vz. 28 began in 1928 at the Škoda Works in Pilsen.  The design attempted to combine the howitzer  and mountain gun roles into one weapon.  The houfnice vz. 28 combined a two-wheeled box trail carriage, horizontal sliding-wedge breech, Hydro-pneumatic recoil system and high angle elevation.  For the mountain gun role it could be broken down into three pieces for transport, a feature also shared by the contemporary 8 cm kanon vz. 28 and the later 8 cm kanon vz. 30 and 10 cm houfnice vz. 30 guns.  The Czech Army declined to adopt the houfnice vz. 28, but ordered its successor the houfnice vz. 30 in larger numbers.  The vz. 30 and vz. 28 shared a similar configuration, dimensions and their performance was largely the same.

Notes

References
 Peter Chamberlain and Terry Gander: Light and Medium field Artillery. New York. Arco Publishing. 1977.

External links
 https://web.archive.org/web/20071202052427/http://warandgame.wordpress.com/2007/11/21/skoda-765-mm-kanon-vz-30-and-100-mm-houfnice-vz-30/

World War II artillery of Germany
World War II field artillery
Artillery of Czechoslovakia
100 mm artillery
Military equipment introduced in the 1920s